The Rhodesian dollar (R$ or Rh$) was the currency of Rhodesia between 1970 and 1980. It was subdivided into 100 cents.

History

The dollar was introduced on 17 February 1970, less than a month before the declaration of a republic on 2 March 1970. It replaced the Rhodesian pound at a rate of 2 dollars to 1 pound. The dollar proved to be a strong currency, at parity with the pound sterling right up to the very end of Rhodesia in 1980, when it was replaced by the Zimbabwean dollar at par. However, the Rhodesian dollar was never a fully convertible currency and its exchange rate was therefore not an indication of the underlying economics.

Half pound

In adopting the Rhodesian dollar, Rhodesia followed the pattern of South Africa, Australia, and New Zealand in that when it adopted the decimal system, it decided to use the half pound unit as opposed to the pound unit of account. The choice of the name dollar was favoured by the then Minister of Finance, John Wrathall, who regarded it as having international substance.

Coins

On 17 February 1970 the Rhodesian dollar was introduced and was par to the Pound; the currency was manufactured as follows - bronze  and 1 cent and cupro-nickel  cent coins were introduced, which circulated alongside the earlier coins of the Rhodesian pound for 5, 10, 20 and 25 cents, which were also denominated in shillings and pence. New 5-cent coins were introduced in 1973, followed by 10, 20 and 25 cents in 1975. Coins were struck until 1977 at the South African Mint in Pretoria.

Rhodesia had both  Cent and  Cents coins, just like in South Africa.

 The  Cent coin was struck between 1970 and 1977 - with the 1977  Cent being extremely rare, with 10 coins known.
 The  Cents (Tickey) was struck in 1970 only.
 The 5 Cents was struck in 1973 and between 1975 and 1977.
 The 10 and 25 Cents was struck in 1975 only.
 The 20 Cents was struck in 1975 and 1977.

Tommy Sasseen was the designer of all Rhodesian coins from 1964 to 1968 (reverse only) and 1970 to 1977 (both obverse and reverse).

Banknotes

On 17 February 1970, the Reserve Bank of Rhodesia introduced notes in denominations of 1, 2 and 10 dollars. 5-dollar notes were added in 1972.

Exchange rate history

This table shows the historical value of one Rhodesian dollar.

References

External links
 Rhodesian Currency Page, with a short description of each note.

Modern obsolete currencies
Currencies of Africa
Currencies introduced in 1970
dollar
Currencies of the Commonwealth of Nations
Rhodesia
1970 establishments in Rhodesia
1980 disestablishments in Zimbabwe